The Cannone navale da 381/40 was an Italian naval gun intended to equip the dreadnought battleships of the . The ships were cancelled in 1916 and their guns were diverted to other uses. Most of the monitors were disarmed after World War I and their guns were transferred to coast-defense batteries which were used throughout World War II.

Development
The Italians ordered thirty guns in 1913, ten each from Ansaldo-Schneider, Armstrong-Pozzuoli, and Vickers-Terni. The guns had identical ballistic performance, but differed in construction. The government favored the English design and ordered another ten in 1914 from Armstrong-Pozzuoli despite the fact that the Ansaldo guns weighed only  compared to the Armstrong's . The propellant for the projectiles weighed either . The rate of fire varied for each type of mount, but did not exceed one round per minute in the naval mount.

Ammunition

Service 
The Francesco Caracciolo-class ships were laid down in 1914–1915, but material shortages and the Italian declaration of war on Austria-Hungary in 1915 forced the Regia Marina to suspend construction in favor of higher-priority programs. This freed up their guns to be used for other purposes. By this time Armstrong-Pozzuoli had started work on a dozen guns, the last of which were finished around 1922, Ansaldo-Schneider had finished one proving gun and nine production weapons and Vickers-Terni had built around three guns.

Coast-defense guns
One twin-gun turret was built as Batteria Amalfi on the Cavallino coast (northeast of Venice). Construction began in September 1915 and took 17 months to complete. Equipped with a pair of Vickers-Terni guns, the turret was installed on the roof of a concrete bunker that contained the ammunition, and the sleeping quarters for the artillerymen manning the turret. Electrical generators and the hydraulic pumps were in separate structures connected to the main bunker by tunnels. The guns in the turret had a maximum elevation of +20°. The turret could revolve 360°, which allowed it to provide fire support for the Italian forces within range during the Second Battle of the Piave River in June 1918.

Two other twin-gun turrets were installed near Brindisi: Batteries Benedetto Brin and Fratelli Bandiera. Construction of both began in 1916, but only the former was completed during the war, test-firing its Armstrong-Pozzuoli guns in September 1917. The latter was originally planned to be equipped with  guns, but it was modified to suit a pair of Armstrong-Pozzuoli guns in 1917; construction was suspended later that year, before it was finally completed in 1923. These bunkers were almost identical to Amalfi, except that they were entirely self-contained.

Although three other twin-gun turrets were planned during the 1930s, only one (Batteria Capo S. Panagia) north of Augusta, Sicily, was actually built, completed in 1934 with Armstrong-Pozzuoli guns. This turret was different than the earlier ones as its ammunition was loaded through doors in the rear of the turret, rather than the naval-type hoists previous used. Its gun could elevate to +30°. After the Italian declaration of war on France and Britain in June and the British bombardment of Genoa in early 1941, two turrets were built near the port: Batteria Monte Moro in Quinto al Mare-Genoa and Batteria Punta S. Martino in Arenzano-Genoa. Both were completed in mid-1942 and they were the same type as the turret installed in Sicily.

After Operation Husky, the Allied invasion of Sicily in mid-1943, Batteria Capo S. Panagia was demolished by its garrison before they surrendered. The two batteries at Brindisi never fired their guns in anger and were captured by the Allies in good condition. The two Genoese batteries and Batteria Amalfi were captured by the Germans after the Italian armistice in September 1943, being operated by them and the forces of the puppet  (Italian Social Republic) for the rest of the war. Batteria Monte Moro was besieged by partisans for several days before surrendering to the American 92nd Infantry Division on 29 April 1945 while Batteria Punta S. Martino was damaged by the Germans before the end of the war. Batteria Amalfi was surrendered by the Germans at the end of the war.

Railroad guns
Seven of the Schneider-Ansaldo guns were transferred to the Army although only four were turned into Cannone da 381/40 AVS railroad guns. The gun could elevate to a maximum of 25° and it could traverse 2° on its mount. The guns were delivered during 1917 and supported Italian operations along the Isonzo and in the Trentino. They were placed in reserve after the war and remained in storage at La Spezia for the duration of World War II.

Coastal monitors
Two Ansaldo guns were mounted on the monitor  which was completed in 1917. She played a small role in the 11th Battle of the Isonzo supporting Italian troops, but was blown ashore in a storm in November. The monitor was not refloated until shortly before the end of the war and was decommissioned in 1924. Renamed GM 194 when she was reactivated in 1939 in preparation for World War II, she was towed to Genoa to bolster its defenses. Her guns were quickly disabled when an electric cable was cut during the British bombardment of Genoa. She was captured by the Germans after the Italian armistice and was turned over to the puppet  (National Republican Navy). GM 194 was scuttled in Savona at the end of the war and was subsequently scrapped.

The monitor  was converted from a floating crane and fitted with two Armstrong-Pozzuoli guns in a turret in 1916. Her guns had a maximum elevation of +20° and could only traverse 15° to either side. The ship also participated in the 11th Battle of the Isonzo before she foundered during a storm off Ancona, Italy, in November 1917. Two captured Austro-Hungarian self-propelled barges ( and ) were rebuilt and fitted with one gun apiece. They were completed in July and September 1918 respectively and used to support Italian forces near Venice in the last few months of the war. All of the monitors except Faà di Bruno were disarmed in 1924 and converted to other uses.

Gallery

See also
 BL 15 inch Mk I naval gun: British naval equivalent
 38 cm SK L/45 "Max": German naval and land equivalent

References

Sources

Further reading

External links
 Italian-language site on Battery Amalfi
Italian 381 mm/40 (15") Model 1914 on Navweaps.com

 
 

Naval guns of Italy
Railway guns
World War I artillery of Italy
World War II artillery of Italy
380 mm artillery
Coastal artillery
Gio. Ansaldo & C. artillery